Anita Dorris (1903–1993) was a German actress of the Silent era. She played the role of Trilby in the 1927 film Svengali. She was the mother of Maria Emo who also became an actress.

Selected filmography
 Frau Sopherl vom Naschmarkt (1926)
 The Mill at Sanssouci (1926)
 Vienna - Berlin (1926)
 When I Came Back (1926)
 Fedora (1926)
 The Trumpets are Blowing (1926)
 The White Horse Inn (1926)
 Svengali (1927)
 Bigamie (1927)
 Queen Louise (1927)
 Love Affairs (1927)
 The Schorrsiegel Affair (1928)
 Behind Monastery Walls (1928)
 Honour Thy Mother (1928)
 The Girl from the Provinces (1929)
 Eros in Chains (1929)
 Alimente (1930)
 Gigolo (1930)
 Student Life in Merry Springtime (1931)

Bibliography
 Thomas, Douglas A. The early history of German motion pictures, 1895-1935. Thomas International, 1999.

External links

References

1903 births
1993 deaths
German film actresses
German silent film actresses
Actors from Lübeck
20th-century German actresses